The Titov Main Test and Space Systems Control Centre (also referenced as the Titov Space Control Centre and Titov Space Centre) is the main Russian military and commercial satellite control centre. It is run by the Russian Space Forces.

History
A resolution of the Council of Ministers of 30 January 1956 provided for the establishment of a command and control complex for the first flight satellites. Work on the construction of the centre began on May 8, 1957. GITSIU COP and subordinate military units together with the Mission Control Centre support the entire space programme. The military is responsible for the condition of many domestic orbital systems — military, scientific, manned and other. Specialists at the  main centre started working with the first launches, first artificial satellite, the first manned flight into space. They also worked on Soviet Moonwalkers (lunokhody), and on the programme for the orbital station Mir, right up until the last seconds of its existence. Now among their many tasks is work with the International Space Station.

Centre
Currently the Centre manages 75% of the domestic Russian orbital spacecraft constellation. By order of the Russian President on 14 August 2001, the centre was named after Gherman Titov, to honour the second human to orbit the Earth, who had been one of the leaders of the Centre.

The centre has locations throughout Russia involved in testing, measuring and certifying equipment which are subordinated to the main centre.

See also

 Plesetsk Cosmodrome
 Kapustin Yar

References

Soviet and Russian space program locations
Space technology research institutes
Military installations of Russia
1957 establishments in Russia